Switz Kill converges with Fox Creek in Berne, New York.

The stream was named for the fact a large share of the early settlers were Swiss.

References 

Rivers of New York (state)
Rivers of Albany County, New York